Lucy Surhyel Newman is an international consultant and policy advisor.

Newman was born in Mubi, northeastern Nigeria. She grew up in a large and internationally dispersed nuclear and extended family in northern Nigeria and lives in Lagos.

Early life 
Newman was born on July 16, 1965, as Lucy Surhyel Angaya Bwala (also known as Mitti – Surhyel, after her paternal grandmother) to parents Mallam Angaya Mshelbwala and Malama Tani Angaya Mshelbwala (now both deceased) in Mubi, which is now known as Adamawa State in the north-eastern part of Nigeria. She is a Christian and hails from Marama in Hawul local Government Area of Borno State. She speaks Hausa, Bwurrah Kanuri, English and French.

Education
She obtained her primary education form Shehu Garbai Primary School located in Maisandari, Damboa Road Old G.R.A. in Maiduguri Metropolitan Area, Borno State Nigeria. Thereafter, she proceeded to Federal Government College, Kaduna, Kaduna State for her secondary school education and graduated in 1983. She attended Ahmadu Bello University, and between 1984 and 1993 she obtained A-levels from the School of Basic Studies, a Bachelor of Science of Business Administration with majors in Financial Management, and a master's degree in business administration. In 2008, she obtained her Doctorate in business administration from the University of Phoenix in Phoenix, Arizona, United States, with a focus on Leadership and Performance. From 2019 to 2020, she enrolled for and completed the International Director Certification in Corporate Governance Programme, a one-year Executive Education Programme at INSEAD Business School, Fontainebleau, France. Lucy has affiliations to many professional networks including:

 Fellow, Nigerian Institute of Management
 Fellow, Institute of Directors Nigeria
 Certified Performance Technologist of the International Society for Performance Improvement
 Life Member of the International Society for Performance Improvement

Career
Newman began her career with Borno Investment Company Limited [BICL] in 1987 as a Youth Corper and rose to become the General Manager of a subsidiary company in Lagos. Her work at BICL lasted ten years. In 1997, she joined Omega Bank as a Manager of Treasury Marketing and Product Development. In July 2000, she joined FSB International Bank, Plc, first as a Manager, Marketing and Business Development. Later she became the Head, HR Development from 2002 to 2005. Via industry merger and acquisition, she joined Fidelity Bank, PLC in January 2006 as the Head, HR Development/Group Head, HR Designate. In April 2006, she joined the United Bank for Africa Group, Plc first as Head, Talent & Performance Management, and then Head, Career & Reward Management. In August 2006 she proceeded to PricewaterhouseCoopers Nigeria as the Senior Consultant, in the firm's Performance Improvement Practice. Between January 2008 and April 2009 she was a Principal Consultant in the Business Advisory Performance Improvement Practice. In May 2009, Newman joined the Financial Institutions Training Centre (FITC), as the Managing Director/CEO. Her first tenure was extended in 2013 and ended September 2019.

She then took a voluntary early retirement from the FITC role and a proceeded on a one-year career break during which she completed the INSEAD International Director Certification on Corporate Governance Executive Programme and published, which saw her transitioning her career into Policy Advisory, International Consulting and Authorship.

Board roles
 Non-Executive Director – Renaissance Development Forum [RDF] Board, Nigeria [Non-Governmental Organization] July 2020 - Date Member of the Governing Board and Member of the Board Governance, Digitization and Sustainability Committee.
 Member, ANAP Foundation Covid – 19 Think Tank. Nigeria [Non-Governmental Organization] March 2020 - Date. Non-Executive Member of the Think Tank and Member, Volunteer Management as well as Data & Analytics Sub Team.
 Member, Advisory Board of the African Center for Development Finance [ACDF] which is a Think Tank of Stellenbosch University Business School. South Africa. [Public, Educational Research] March 2019 – present.
 Member, 16 Person C K Prahalad Award for Social Innovation Global Jury Panel. November 2020 to present.
 Non-Executive Director – West African Theological Seminary [WATS], Nigeria. [Private, Faith Based] February 2021 – to November 2021 Non-Executive Member of the Governing Council.
 Non-Executive Director – International University for Information Management [IUIM], United States. [Private Educational] July 2020 – September 2021 Non-Executive Member of the Governing Council.
 Elected member, Governing Council of the Institute of Directors [IoD], Nigeria [Professional Network] June 2018 to June 2020.
 Elected International Director, Global Board of the International Society for Performance Improvement [ISPI] representing members in 48 countries. April 2012 to April 2014.
 Ex-Officio Member, Bank Directors' Association of Nigeria [BDAN] May 2009 to September, 2019.  [Professional Network].
 Managing Director, Financial Institutions Training Center [FITC] Nigeria May 2009 to September, 2019. [Professional Services Firm].
 Ex- Officio Member, West African Bankers' Association [WABA] May 2009 to September, 2019. [Professional Network].

Honours
 2019 – Thomas F. Gilbert Distinguished Professional Achievement Award by ISPI
 2019 – Outstanding Women Leaders in Corporate Nigeria and Society at the Great Place to Work, Africa Awards, Lagos, Nigeria
 2017 – MMS WHoF Award & admission into the Money Management Series Women of Fortune Hall of Fame
 2016 – Sir Ahmadu Bello Sardauna Platinum Leadership Excellence Award as "Garkuwan Matasan Arewa" (aka shield of the northern youth)
 2015 – Africa's Patriotic Amazon by League of African Development Students, Africa
 2015 – Women of Merit Gold Award by People State & Resources, Nigeria
 2014 – Outstanding Mothers' recognition, by R – Wells Media, Nigeria
 2014 – Credit Management Honours Award, from the Institute of Credit Administrators of Nigeria
 2014 – Outstanding Leadership Award by ISPI for achievements during term as International Director on the Global Board of ISPI from 2012/2014

Publications
 
 
 
 Newman, L. S (2022). African Leaders' Tete A Tete: Navigating Entity Design And Prioritization For Systemic Outcomes. Dallas, Texas, USA: Pyxidia House.
 Newman, L.S (2022). Directors' Eyes on Africa- A Reflection on Agenda 2063's second Phase. The Director, a Magazine of the Institute of Directors Nigeria. Issue No. 29; Pages 12–16.
 Newman, L. S. (2020). Storytelling: An African Leadership Journey of Performance Improvement Innovation. In Van Time, D. M., & Burns, N. C. (Eds.), Cases on Performance Improvement Innovation (pp. 126–155). IGI Global. .
 Newman, L.S (2020). Corporate Governance and Performance Imperatives for Directors in Africa: SDGs, AfCFTA and Agenda 2063. The Director, a Magazine of the Institute of Directors Nigeria. Issue No. 24; Pages 64–71.
 Newman, L.S (2019). Leveraging Corporate Governance for Economic Development: Imperatives for Governments and Regulators in Sub Saharan Africa. The Director, a Magazine of the Institute of Directors Nigeria. Issue No. 22, Pages: 37–48.
 Newman, L. S (2018). From Idea to Reality: The FITC Story. A case study published in People First Magazine Vol.7 No. 1(17-22). Chartered Institute of Personnel Management of Nigeria (CIPMN).
 Newman, L. S (2017). The Role of Development Finance Institutions in Development: Missed Opportunities and Imperatives for the Financial System. A paper published in the FITC Journal of Banking and Finance, Vol. 13 (1).
 Newman, L.S (2015). Branding Beyond Logo and Colors: A case study of FITC's evidence-based transformation. Being Chapter 13 of the book, J. Stefaniak (Ed.) (2015) Cases on Human Performance Improvement Technologies. Hershey, PA: IGI Publishing.
 Newman, L. S (2014). Ethical Values in the Financial Market Performance in Nigeria: recent Issues and Progress. An article published in the Financial Nigeria; Development and Finance Journal, Vol. 6 No. 71, June 2014; pp: 30–32.
 Newman, L.S (2014). Industry Sustainability and the ‘New’ Primary Mortgage Banks. An article published in the Financial Nigeria; Development and Finance Journal, Vol. 6 No. 70, May 2014; pp: 16–17.
 Newman, L. S (2013). Leveraging Corporate Governance for Economic Development: Imperatives for Regulators in Sub Saharan Africa. A paper published in Financial Nigeria; Development and Finance Journal, Vol. 6 No. 63, October 2013; pp: 16–18.
 Newman, L. S (2012). Issues and Challenges of Gender Diversity and Inclusiveness. A paper published in the Human resource Management Journal; Journal of the Chartered Institute of Personnel Management of Nigeria, Vol. 4 No: 1, 2012, 29–32.
 Newman, L. S (2011). Transformational Leadership; A Leadership approach for changing Times. A paper published in the FITC Journal of Banking and Finance, Vol. 2 No, 2011; pp 03–17.
 Newman, L.S (2011). Effects of Employee Performance Management Systems on Employee Learning and Leadership Development, 2011 – Published by LAP Publishing, Germany.
 Newman, L.S (2009). The CEO's triple dilemma of compensation, employee and corporate performance, being a one-chapter manuscript along with 9 other authors in the book, “The Refractive Thinker: an anthology of higher learning” published by the Lentz Leadership Institute of Las Vegas, Nevada USA. . Spring 2009.
 Newman, L. S (2008). Effects of Employee Performance Management Systems on Employee Learning and Development, a qualitative method dissertation in partial fulfilment of conditions precedent to a Doctorate in Business Administration (DBA) submitted to the University of Phoenix, Arizona. USA. It is a study of themes and patterns of practice to develop a new concept leading to the likely development of a new theory in performance management, and was published by ProQuest UMI. . October 2008.
 Newman, L. S (August, 2007). Emerging HR Landmines: Critical Concerns for CEOs. Being an article published the Business Day Daily Newspaper of Thursday August 30, 2007.
 Newman, L.S (February, 2007). The CEOs dual dilemma: governance & sustainability in an increasingly dynamic global business environment. Being an article published on the Business Day Daily Newspaper of Monday February 19, 2007.
 Mshelia, L.S (1998). Change Integration for Corporate Survival and Growth. A competitive study for the “1998 Young Manager Competition” of the Nigerian Institute of Management. The research population was registered organizations in Nigeria, with a sample of five high performing industry leaders from five sectors of the Nigerian economy listed on the Nigerian Stock Exchange. Being a research that was selected as first position for the Lagos zone Competition and came third for the National Competition in 1998, by the NIMN.
 Mshelia, L.S (1993). The role Development Finance Institutions in Nigeria: A Case study on Borno Investment Company Limited. A mixed method thesis in partial fulfilment of conditions precedent to a Masters in Business Administration (MBA) submitted to Ahmadu Bello University, Zaria. Nigeria.
 Bwala, L.A (1987). The Nigerian Financial System. A qualitative method thesis in partial fulfilment of conditions precedent to a Bachelors of Sciences Degree (BS.C) in Business Administration submitted to Ahmadu Bello University Zaria, Nigeria.

References

Living people
Hausa people
PricewaterhouseCoopers people
University of Phoenix alumni
Ahmadu Bello University alumni
1965 births
People from Adamawa State
Nigerian business executives